Homer Jones may refer to:

 Homer Jones (politician) (1893–1970), American politician
 Homer Jones (American football) (born 1941), American former football wide receiver
 Homer Jones (economist) (1906–1986), American economist

See also
Homer C Jones, New Mexico, an unincorporated community